The Highlands Formation is a geologic formation in Antigua and Barbuda. It preserves fossils of megalodon dating back to the Pliocene period. Among others, the formation has provided fossils of megalodon.

See also 
 List of fossiliferous stratigraphic units in Antigua and Barbuda

References

Geologic formations of the Caribbean
Geology of Antigua and Barbuda
Neogene Caribbean
Limestone formations
Shallow marine deposits
Fossiliferous stratigraphic units of North America
Paleontology in the Caribbean